Pickerel may refer to:

Animals
 Esox, a genus of fish commonly known as the pickerels
 American pickerel
 Chain pickerel
 Redfin pickerel
 Pickerel frog
 Walleye, a fish unrelated to Esox, is called Pickerel in parts of Canada

Places
 Pickerel Creek, Missouri
 Pickerel River (disambiguation)
 Pickerel, Virginia
 Pickerel, Wisconsin

People with the surname
 Mark Pickerel, American musician

Other uses
 USS Pickerel, several ships of the United States Navy